Mondo Trasho is a 1969 American 16mm mondo black comedy film by John Waters. The film stars Divine, Mary Vivian Pearce, David Lochary and Mink Stole. It contains very little dialogue, the story being told mostly through musical cues.

Plot
After an introductory sequence during which chickens are beheaded on a chopping block, the main action begins. Platinum blond bombshell Mary Vivian Pearce begins her day by riding the bus and reading Kenneth Anger's Hollywood Babylon.

Bombshell is later seduced by a hippie degenerate "shrimper" (foot fetishist), who starts molesting her feet while she fantasizes about being Cinderella. She is then hit by a car driven by Divine, a portly blonde who was trying to pick up an attractive hitchhiker whom she imagines naked. Divine places her in the car and drives distractedly around Baltimore experiencing bizarre situations, such as repeated visits by the Blessed Virgin Mary (Margie Skidmore)—during which Divine exclaims, "Oh Mary ... teach me to be Divine". Divine finally takes the unconscious Bombshell to Dr. Coathanger, who amputates her feet and replaces them with bird-like monster feet which she can tap together to transport herself around Baltimore.

Cast

Production
Depending on versions of the story; either Waters or the whole crew (except Divine) was either arrested or nearly arrested during production for illegally shooting a scene involving a nude hitchhiker on the campus of Johns Hopkins University. However, according to contemporary newspaper accounts, only one person was immediately arrested, actor Mark P. Isherwood. Charged sometime later were John Waters, Nancy Stoll, David C. Lochary and Mary V. Pearce, all five for indecent exposure, but the charges were eventually dropped.

Title
The film's title refers to a series of semi-related quasi-documentary films that were popular during the 1960s: Mondo Cane, Mondo Freudo, Mondo Bizarro, etc. The title also pays tribute to Mondo Topless, a film by one of Waters' favorite directors, Russ Meyer.

Music
Waters, in a 2008 interview, stated that the songs used in the film were taken right out of his own record collection. Waters says he did not pay the proper licensing fees to use these songs because he could not afford to. It is because of this, Waters says, that Mondo Trasho remains out of distribution, as the still-unsecured music rights would be too prohibitively expensive to clear.

Reception
Mondo Trasho currently holds a 43% approval rating on Rotten Tomatoes, based on seven reviews.

Background
Waters himself has stated that he does not care for this movie. In an interview with British Film Institute Waters said it should have been a short film instead of a feature but was a feature-length due to being influenced by films such as Andy Warhol's experimental film Sleep.

Home Media
The film was only produced in 1984 on a 95 min rated R VHS, hi-fi mono sound in black and white by Cinema Group Home Video.

In an interview with the Harvard Book Store in Cambridge, MA on tour for his book release of Mr Know-It-All: The Tarnished Wisdom of a Filth Elder (2019), John stated that Mondo Trasho would never get released again due to copyright issues with the music and that it would cost $1 million dollars just to secure rights for the music.

See also
 List of American films of 1969

References

External links
 
 
 Dreamland Studios

1969 films
1960s black comedy films
American black comedy films
American independent films
American satirical films
American black-and-white films
Films about amputees
Films directed by John Waters
Films set in Baltimore
Films shot in Baltimore
1969 directorial debut films
1969 comedy films
1969 drama films
Drag (clothing)-related films
1960s English-language films
1960s American films